Bidens trichosperma, the marsh beggar-ticks or marsh tickseed, is a North American species of flowering plant in the family Asteraceae. It is native to central Canada (Quebec, Ontario) and to the eastern and north-central United States (primarily the Northeast, Great Lakes, and northern Great Plains, with a few isolated populations in the Southeast).

Bidens trichosperma  is an annual  herb up to 150 cm (60 inches) tall. It produces numerous yellow flower heads containing both disc florets and ray florets. The species is commonly found in marshes and along estuaries.

It should not be confused with Bidens coronata, which it was once considered synonymous with. Both species may be referred to as crowned beggar-ticks but the name properly belongs to coronata.

References

trichosperma
Flora of North America
Plants described in 1803